Charlie Scott (born 2 September 1997) is an English professional footballer who plays as a midfielder for Hong Kong Premier League club Kitchee.

Career
Born in Stoke-on-Trent, Scott joined Manchester United in July 2014. In January 2018, he had a trial at Sheffield United, and later that month moved on loan to Hamilton Academical. He made his senior debut on 28 April 2018. He was released by Manchester United at the end of the 2017–18 season.

After training with Altrincham for some time, he signed for the club on 2 November 2018. He made his debut in a Cheshire Senior Cup match against Congleton Town, playing the full 90 minutes in a 2–0 defeat. However, he left the club at the end of November to seek more regular game time.

In January 2019, he joined Northern Premier League Division One West side Newcastle Town. He made his debut on 5 January in a 4–0 defeat against Radcliffe.

In the summer of 2019, Scott signed for Kidsgrove Athletic. He made four appearances for the club before departing in September 2019. He subsequently returned to Newcastle Town later that month. Scott combined his football career with working as a construction site labourer.

On 21 July 2020, Scott signed for Hong Kong Premier League club Happy Valley.

On 11 August 2021, Scott signed for another HKPL club Kitchee.

Career statistics

Honours
Individual
Hong Kong Premier League Team of the Year: 2020–21
Hong Kong Top Footballer Awards Hong Kong Premier League Player's Player of the Year

References

1997 births
Living people
Footballers from Stoke-on-Trent
English footballers
Manchester United F.C. players
Hamilton Academical F.C. players
Altrincham F.C. players
Newcastle Town F.C. players
Kidsgrove Athletic F.C. players
Happy Valley AA players
Kitchee SC players
Scottish Professional Football League players
Hong Kong Premier League players
Association football midfielders
English expatriate footballers
English expatriates in Hong Kong
Expatriate footballers in Hong Kong